Roscolyn Tor is a high sandstone feature about 1 nautical mile (1.9 km) southwest of Warren Peak in the Allan Hills of Victoria Land. Reconnoitered by the New Zealand Antarctic Research Program (NZARP) Allan Hills Expedition (1964) who gave the name after a similar feature at Rhoscolyn in Anglesey, Wales.
 

Rock formations of Oates Land